The Charleston Indians were an American minor league baseball team based in Charleston, West Virginia. They were an affiliate of the Cleveland Indians in the Eastern League from 1962-1964. They were previously the Reading Indians.

External links
Baseball Reference

Defunct minor league baseball teams
Defunct Eastern League (1938–present) teams
Cleveland Guardians minor league affiliates
Baseball teams established in 1962
Sports clubs disestablished in 1964
1962 establishments in West Virginia
1964 disestablishments in West Virginia
Sports in Charleston, West Virginia
Professional baseball teams in West Virginia
Defunct baseball teams in West Virginia
Baseball teams disestablished in 1964